Jack Chamberlain may refer to:
Jack Chamberlain (politician) (1884–1953), Australian politician in Tasmania
Jack Chamberlain (sportsman) (1884–1941), Australian rules footballer and cricketer
Jack Chamberlain (tennis), British tennis player who competed at Wimbledon in 1929, 1930 and 1935

See also
John Chamberlain (disambiguation)